Eudonia probolaea is a moth of the family Crambidae. It is endemic to the Hawaiian islands of Kauai and Hawaii.

Eudonia omichlopis is considered a valid species by some authors, while others include it within E. probolaea.

External links

Eudonia
Endemic moths of Hawaii
Moths described in 1899